The Revenge Tour was the first and only concert tour by American rapper and singer XXXTentacion in support of his second mixtape, Revenge (2017), and partially in support of his then-upcoming debut studio album, 17 (2017). It traveled across the United States in fourteen different states. The tour started on May 31, 2017 in Houston, Texas and ended on July 2, 2017 in Pompano Beach, Florida. The tour was supported by X's hip hop collective, Members Only, which included fellow rappers such as Ski Mask the Slump God, Craig Xen, and Wifisfuneral. While X made multiple concert appearances following the Revenge Tour, it was his only ever concert tour as he was murdered in June 2018. The tour was subject to multiple controversies.

Background 
XXXTentacion revealed the Revenge Tour as his first headling tour in April 2017 and tickets went up for sale later in the month. It represented his second mixtape Revenge and promoted his upcoming debut album, 17. The dates were set from May 31 to July 2. The tour was temporarily postponed midway due to the shooting of X's cousin.

Incidents 
The Revenge Tour was the subject of multiple controversial incidents. On the first date of the tour on May 31 in Houston, Members Only rapper Wifisfuneral was assaulted after a failed attempt at crowdsurfing in the audience. X asked the crowd who was responsible for the attack, but did not receive an answer. Wifisfuneral was briefly hospitalized, but made a recovery and went on to attend the remainder of the tour.

On June 7, while in the middle of singing, X was sucker punched in the head by an assailant at a stop in San Diego and was left unconscious for a short time. Security recommended to X that he cancel the remainder of the show, and he obliged. At the time of the incident, X had been involved in a dispute with rapper Rob Stone, and speculation ensued that the attacker was associated with Stone. X and Stone later confirmed that they had spoken and that the tension between the two had been resolved. An audience member was also stabbed at the same concert stop and was hospitalized. No arrests were publicly reported.

On June 17, at a stop in Denver, X punched a fan after the fan had placed his hand directly upon X's chest. X claimed self-defense, but apologized to the fan and admitted that he had overreacted. X later brought the fan on stage.

Political commentary 
During the Revenge Tour, X routinely advocated for racial and gay rights, stating at one concert, "I don't give a fuck if you're black, white, yellow, purple—I don't give a fuck if you're gay, I don't give a fuck if you're straight, I give a fuck if you're a person... I stand for equality for all people," and initiated crowd chants of "fuck the KKK" and "fuck Donald Trump". X later criticized the media for their coverage of the tour, arguing that his advocacy for equal rights during the tour had not been covered as much as its controversies.

Set list 
This set list is representative of the average of 14 tour stops. It is not intended to represent all concerts for the duration of the tour.

"Take a Step Back"
"R.I.P. Roach"
"What in XXXTarnation" 
"Look at Me!"
"Wassup Bro!"
"Revenge"
"King"
"Crucify Thy Infant, Son of a Whore"
"Yung Bratz"
"Where's the Blow" 
"Suicide Pit"
"#ImSippinTeaInYoHood" 
"Life is Short"
"ILoveItWhenTheyRun"
"I Spoke to the Devil in Miami, He Said Everything Would Be Fine"
"H2O" 
"Bowser"
"Slipknot"
Encore
"Look at Me!"
"Take a Step Back"

Shows

References 

2017 concert tours
Concert tours of North America
Concert tours of the United States
XXXTentacion